Kennard Medlock (born October 31, 1949) is an American character actor and former baseball player known for his role in Moneyball. As a player, Medlock was a pitcher for the Decatur Commodores in the 1970s. He later worked as a coach for the St. Paul Saints.

Filmography

Film

Television

References

External links 

Living people
Decatur Commodores players
1949 births